Chun Ma is one of the 41 constituencies of the Sha Tin District Council. The seat elects one member of the council every four years. The constituency has an estimated population of 13,863.

Councillors represented

Election results

2010s

References

Constituencies of Hong Kong
Constituencies of Sha Tin District Council
1999 establishments in Hong Kong
Constituencies established in 1999